Beethoven's 2nd is a 1993 American family film directed by Rod Daniel, and starred Charles Grodin, Bonnie Hunt, and Debi Mazar, and is the second of eight installments in the Beethoven film series. Initially, no sequel was planned, but it was produced after the unexpected financial success of the first film. It is the last entry in the franchise to be released theatrically, as well as to feature the original cast.

Plot

In the Newton family home, George, Alice, Ryce, Ted, Emily, and Beethoven are all well adjusted to living together. Beethoven sneaks out and meets a female St. Bernard named Missy and her owner, Brillo. His soon-to-be ex-wife, Regina, arrives with her boyfriend, Floyd, takes Missy, and is seeking $50,000 in the settlement as alimony. She has retained full custody of Missy and only plans to transfer her to Brillo once the divorce is finalized.

With Beethoven's help, Missy escapes from Regina's condominium, and they fall in love. Meanwhile, Ryce develops strong feelings for her classmate, Taylor Devereaux, after he kisses her. Ted and Emily become aware of Beethoven constantly sneaking out of the house and follow him, where they discover he and Missy had four puppies in the basement of the building. The janitor also finds them and informs Regina. She reclaims Missy and plans to get rid of the puppies, even if it means killing them, but the janitor talks her out of it by pointing out that purebred puppies are worth a lot of money and suggests that she could sell them at a pet store and make a fortune.

Thinking Regina plans to drown the puppies, Ted and Emily sneak them out of the building and take them home. They keep them in their basement so George will not see them. Realizing they took them, Regina plans revenge. Ryce, Ted, and Emily take it upon themselves to feed and care for them. Eventually, George discovers them and reluctantly agrees to keep them until they are mature.

The Newtons are offered a free stay in a lakefront house in the mountains owned by one of George's business associates. There, Taylor invites Ryce to a party with friends where she is exposed to teenage drinking and sexual harassment. Beethoven destroys the house's patio deck, removing her from potential danger. Regina and Floyd are staying in a location unknown to Brillo, coincidentally near the Newtons' vacation house. The Newtons go to a county fair with the dogs, and Ryce, Ted, and Emily persuade George to enter a burger eating contest with Beethoven, which they win. Regina and Floyd are also at the fair, but leave Missy in their car.

Missy escapes from the car with Beethoven's help while Regina snatches the puppies' leashes from Ted. Beethoven and Missy run into the mountains, followed by Regina and Floyd. The Newtons follow and catch up. After a confrontation between George and Floyd, the latter threatens to drop the puppies in the river below and pokes George in the stomach with a large stick. Beethoven charges into the stick and rams it into Floyd's groin, causing him to lose his balance and fall over the cliff, pulling Regina down with him. They land in a pool of mud and are swept away by the river.

Five months later, Brillo visits the Newtons with Missy, revealing that the judge in the divorce had granted him full custody of her and denied Regina's claim. The puppies, now adults, run downstairs to see her.

Cast
 Charles Grodin as George Newton
 Bonnie Hunt as Alice Newton
 Nicholle Tom as Ryce Newton
 Christopher Castile as Ted Newton
 Sarah Rose Karr as Emily Newton
 Debi Mazar as Regina
 Chris Penn as Floyd
 Ashley Hamilton as Taylor Devereaux
 Danny Masterson as Seth
Catherine Reitman as Janie
 Maury Chaykin as Cliff Klamath
 Heather McComb as Michelle
 Scott Waara as Banker
 Jeff Corey as Gus
 Virginia Capers as Linda Anderson
 Jordan Bond as Jordan
 Pat Jankiewicz as Arthur Lewis
 Kevin Dunn as Brillo (additional cast)

The film was Danny Masterson's screen debut. His younger brother, Christopher, also had a small role, but when the producers noticed the resemblance, they removed him.

Production
The film is set in California, but the park scenes were filmed in Montana at Glacier National Park. The house used as the Newtons' vacation home is located on Milan Avenue in South Pasadena.

Production required more than a hundred smooth- and rough-coated St. Bernard puppies of various ages starting at seven weeks, who were then returned to the breeders. Missy was played by three adult short-haired dogs, and Beethoven was played by two long-haired ones, although only the dog who created the role in the first film is credited; a mechanical dog, a dog's head for specific facial expressions, and a man in a dog suit were also used.

Song
The theme song, "The Day I Fall in Love," performed by James Ingram and Dolly Parton and written by Ingram, Carole Bayer Sager and Clif Magness, was nominated for an Academy Award, a Golden Globe, and a Grammy Award.

Reception
The film grossed more than $118 million at the box office worldwide.

Critical response
Although the film was not well received by film critics, it received acclaim by audiences. Brian Lowry of Variety wrote that it "[amounted] to a live-action cartoon" and was "certainly a more pleasing tale" than the first. Roger Ebert of the Chicago Sun-Times gave it two stars, calling it "no masterpiece" but praising Grodin's work and noting that the dogs carried it. Kevin Thomas in the Los Angeles Times rated it "just as funny and appealing as 'Beethoven' the first" and also praised Mazar as Regina.

On Rotten Tomatoes, the film has a score of 23%, based on reviews from 13 critics, with an average rating of 4.55/10. Audiences surveyed by CinemaScore gave it a grade "A".

In other media
 In 1994, Beethoven: The Ultimate Canine Caper, a side-scrolling video game titled simply Beethoven, but based on the film, was developed for the Sega Genesis and Game Boy. Though completed, it was cancelled before release.
 Harvey Comics: Beethoven (March 1994)

References

External links 
 
 
 
 

1993 films
Films about dogs
Films about pets
Films directed by Rod Daniel
Films shot in Los Angeles County, California
Films shot in Montana
American sequel films
Universal Pictures films
Films produced by Michael C. Gross
Films about vacationing
Films adapted into comics
Films scored by Randy Edelman
Beethoven (franchise)
1990s English-language films
American children's comedy films
1990s American films